Anri Grigorov (born 18 October 1964) is a retired Bulgarian sprinter who specialized in the 100 metres.

He finished eighth at the 1989 European Indoor Championships.

His personal best time was 10.23 seconds, achieved 7 June 1987 in Sofia. This ranks him third among Bulgarian 100 metres sprinters, only behind Petar Petrov and Valentin Atanasov.

References 

1964 births
Living people
Bulgarian male sprinters